The Hurst Park Novices' Chase was a National Hunt novice chase in England. 
It was run at Ascot over a distance of 2 miles (3,218 metres), and it was scheduled to take place each year in November.

The race was first run in 1965 and was run for the last time in 1999.  The race held Grade 2 status from 1990 to 1993.  It usually attracted a good quality field but the number of runners was consistently low (averaged less than 5 in last twenty years).

Winners

References
Racing Post:
 ,

References
 

National Hunt chases
National Hunt races in Great Britain
Ascot Racecourse
Discontinued horse races